Claude Rich (8 February 1929 – 20 July 2017) was a French stage and screen actor. He began his career in the theater before his film debut in 1955.

Personal life

He married actress Catherine Renaudin on 26 June 1959. They had two daughters, Delphine (an actress) and Nathalie (a painter), and an adopted son, Remy.

Career
In 1996, he was a member of the jury at the 46th Berlin International Film Festival.

Filmography

Theater

Awards
 2002 : Honorary César
 2008 : Prix Henri-Langlois Actor

References

External links

Alain Resnais sur la côte belge

1929 births
2017 deaths
French male film actors
French male stage actors
French male television actors
Actors from Strasbourg
Best Actor César Award winners
César Honorary Award recipients
French National Academy of Dramatic Arts alumni
20th-century French male actors
21st-century French male actors
French male screenwriters
French screenwriters